Gilbert Francis Montriou Campion, 1st Baron Campion  (11 May 1882 – 6 April 1958), known as Sir Gilbert Campion between 1937 and 1950, was a British civil servant. He served as Clerk of the House of Commons from 1937 to 1948.

Background and education
Campion was the son of John Montriou Campion. He was educated at Bedford School and at Hertford College, Oxford.

Career
Campion fought in the First World War as a captain in the Royal Army Service Corps. On 4 April 1921, he was appointed the Second Clerk Assistant of the House of Commons and was promoted to be Clerk Assistant on 28 October 1930, a post he held until 1937.

Honours
In the 1932 New Year Honours, he was appointed to the Order of the Bath as a Companion (CB). On 31 July 1937 Campion was promoted to be the Under Clerk of the Parliaments. He was the editor of the 14th and 15th editions of Erskine May: Parliamentary Practice.

Campion was appointed a Knight Commander of the Order of the Bath in the 1938 New Year Honours (KCB).

He was appointed to be a Knight Grand Cross (GCB) in the 1948 Birthday Honours and retired that year as Under Clerk of the Parliaments, when he was replaced by Frederic Metcalfe . In the 1950 Birthday Honours, his barony for "public services" was announced and he was raised to the peerage as Baron Campion, of Bowes in the County of Surrey.

Family
Campion married Hilda Mary, daughter of W. A. Spafford, in 1920. They had no children. He died in April 1958, aged 75, when the barony became extinct.

Arms

References

External links
Parliamentary Archives, Papers of Sir Gilbert Campion (1882-1958)

1882 births
1958 deaths
Knights Grand Cross of the Order of the Bath
People educated at Bedford School
Alumni of Hertford College, Oxford
British Army personnel of World War I
Royal Army Service Corps officers
Clerks of the House of Commons
Barons created by George VI